The Longyear Hall of Pedagogy (also known as just Longyear Hall) was an academic building located on Presque Isle Avenue, on the campus of Northern Michigan University in Marquette, Michigan.  It was designated a Michigan State Historic Site in 1972 as part of the Kaye Hall Complex, and individually listed on the National Register of Historic Places in 1980, but was demolished in 1993 and removed from the National Register of Historic Places in 2022.

History 

The original Longyear Hall, named for prominent Marquette real estate developer and early Northern Michigan Normal School patron John Munroe Longyear, was constructed in 1900, the year after Northern was founded.  This building burned down in 1905.  A second Longyear Building, a reconstruction of the original, was built in 1907, based on a design by Battle Creek architect E. W. Arnold.  Longyear Hall was used to house administration offices, classrooms, and the library.

In 1915, Kaye Hall was built, which connected Longyear Hall with the nearby Peter White Science Hall (1902) to form a three-building complex.  An addition to the Longyear Hall, housing athletic facilities, was built in 1933.  In 1972, Kaye Hall and the Peter White Science Hall were demolished.  Longyear Hall was abandoned in 1975 when administrative offices were moved, and the structure was never used again.  Despite being listed on the National Register of Historic Places in 1980, Longyear Hall was torn down in 1993.

Description 
The Longyear Hall of Pedagogy was a rectangular two-and-one-half-story structure built with a steel frame sheathed with local Marquette brownstone, with a hipped roof and gabled dormers.  The front entrance was topped by a bank of three rectangular windows and flanked by two-story bay windows.  A stone beltcourse ran between the first and second stories, and a dentil cornice edged the top of the structure.

References

Buildings and structures in Marquette, Michigan
Buildings and structures demolished in 1993
Northern Michigan University
National Register of Historic Places in Marquette County, Michigan
Buildings and structures completed in 1906
Michigan State Historic Sites
Demolished buildings and structures in Michigan
1906 establishments in Michigan